Dylan Daniel Mahmoud Bronn (born 19 June 1995) is a professional footballer who plays as a defender for Italian   club Salernitana. Born in France, he plays for the Tunisia national team. Before becoming professional, Bronn played in the French lower leagues with Cannes, his hometown club.

Club career
Bronn was signed by Niort in the summer of 2016, initially as a reserve team player on an amateur contract. However, first team manager Denis Renaud gave Bronn the chance to play in three of the side's pre-season friendly matches. His performances in these games led Renaud to hand Bronn his professional debut on 29 July 2016 in the 0–0 draw with RC Lens on the first matchday of the year at the Stade René Gaillard. Over the course of the 2016–17 season, he became a regular starter for the first team, forming a central defensive partnership with Jérémy Choplin. On 18 October 2016, Bronn was given a three-year professional contract by Niort.

Bronn joined Belgian First Division A side K.A.A. Gent in 2017. He was elected best player of the season of KAA Gent for the 2018–19 season.

He joined FC Metz in 2020.

On 12 August 2022, Bronn signed a three-year contract with Salernitana in Italy.

International career
Bronn was born in France, and is of Tunisian descent through his mother, and German through his father. Bronn was called up to the Tunisia national team in March 2017. He won his first cap for Tunisia in a friendly match against Morocco on 28 March 2017, playing the whole match in a 1–0 defeat.

In June 2018 he was named in Tunisia’s final 23-man squad for the 2018 World Cup in Russia.

Career statistics

Club

International

Scores and results list Tunisia's goal tally first, score column indicates score after each Bronn goal.

Honours
Tunisia
 Africa Cup of Nations: fourth place: 2019

References

External links
 

1995 births
Living people
Sportspeople from Cannes
Citizens of Tunisia through descent
French sportspeople of Tunisian descent
French people of German descent
Tunisian people of European descent
Tunisian footballers
French footballers
Association football defenders
Tunisia international footballers
2018 FIFA World Cup players
2019 Africa Cup of Nations players
Ligue 2 players
Belgian Pro League players
Ligue 1 players
Serie A players
AS Cannes players
Chamois Niortais F.C. players
K.A.A. Gent players
FC Metz players
U.S. Salernitana 1919 players
Tunisian expatriate footballers
Tunisian expatriate sportspeople in Belgium
Expatriate footballers in Belgium
Tunisian expatriate sportspeople in Italy
Expatriate footballers in Italy
2021 Africa Cup of Nations players
Footballers from Provence-Alpes-Côte d'Azur
2022 FIFA World Cup players